Paul Elaisa (born 21 January 1994), is a Fijian swimmer who has represented Fiji on numerous occasions, with the highlight of his career at the 2012 London Olympic Games.

Career 
Elaisa has also represented Fiji on separate occasions throughout his professional career, which began at the 2008 Oceania Games, in New Zealand. Elaisa moved onto the world stage at 2009, 2011 World Aquatics Championships and in the 2011 Pacific Games (where he won for bronze medals). Later on, Elaisa moved to the United States where he pursued a higher level of education, while actively being involved in the Sport of Swimming. At the 2012 London Olympics, he was placed 3rd in the heat and 47th overall, but did not advance to the semi-finals. Men's 100m freestyle

During his time competing at USA Collegiate level, Elaisa earned All-American in his Freshmen Year Elaisa, while he and the team (Iowa Lakes Community College, NJCAA Division 1) claimed 2nd Place at the 2015 NJCAA Nationals Swimming Championships. The following season during his sophomore year, Elaisa took a "Redshirt" as it is a requirement needed when transferring college. During his Junior year at Lincoln College, Elaisa went onto earning himself All-American and claiming 2 school records. For his Senior year, Elaisa transferred to Lindenwood University (NAIA Division 1), where he and the team went on to defending the title at their Conference Championship Meet. Elaisa qualified for the 2018 NAIA National Swimming Championships and earning yet another All-American while also claiming the University (Lindenwood University) record.

Elaisa went on to represent Fiji at the 2015 Pacific Games, 2016 World Short Course Championships (but was unable to attend due to immigration technicalities), and the 2018 Commonwealth Games where he competed in three events.

References 

Fijian male swimmers
1984 births
Olympic swimmers of Fiji
Swimmers at the 2012 Summer Olympics
Living people
Fijian people of Rotuman descent
Sportspeople from Suva
Commonwealth Games competitors for Fiji
Swimmers at the 2018 Commonwealth Games